Gabbert is a surname. Notable people with the surname include: 

Blaine Gabbert (born 1989), American football quarterback
 James Gabbert (born 1936), San Francisco radio and television entrepreneur
John Gabbert (1909–2013), American jurist
John Gabbert Bowman (1877-1966), American academic
 Michael Gabbert, journalist whose investigations uncovered the 1964 British betting scandal
Sandra Kay Gabbert, one of the victims of Green River Killer Gary Ridgway

See also
 Gabbard (disambiguation)
 Gabbart
 Gabbett